2020 in the Philippines details events of note that have occurred in the Philippines in 2020. The year is largely defined by the COVID-19 pandemic that caused the national economy to go into recession.

Incumbents

 President: Rodrigo Duterte (PDP–Laban)
 Vice President: Leni Robredo (Liberal)
 Congress (18th):
 Senate President: Tito Sotto (NPC)
 House Speaker: 
 Alan Peter Cayetano (Nacionalista) (until October 13)
 Lord Allan Velasco (PDP–Laban) (from October 13)
 Chief Justice: Diosdado Peralta

Events

January

 January 7 – The Philippine Army ordered the relief of Lieutenant Colonel Napoleon Pabon, the commanding officer of the 2nd Infantry Battalion, in connection with the release of a "manipulated" photo of the surrendered of 300 New People's Army rebels in Masbate in December 2019.
 January 8 – President Rodrigo Duterte signed the Salary Standardization Law of 2019, increasing the salaries of over 1.4 million government employees starting this year.
 January 12 – Taal Volcano begins to erupt, prompting PHIVOLCS to raise the alert level to 4 until January 26. The eruption was the first major eruption of Taal since 1977. In response, President Rodrigo Duterte signed Proclamation No. 906 on February 21, declaring a state of calamity in the Calabarzon region for one year unless lifted.
 January 15 – The Philippine government imposed a total deployment ban to Kuwait after a National Bureau of Investigation (NBI) autopsy revealed the grim circumstances surrounding the death of Filipino worker Jeanelyn Villavende in the Gulf state in December 2019. On February 13, the ban was officially lifted, as the two governments reached an agreement for better working conditions of overseas Filipino workers.
 January 16 – The Department of Justice (DOJ) found probable cause to charge former Philippine National Police chief Police General Oscar Albayalde and a dozen police officers over an allegedly anomalous anti-drug operation in Pampanga in November 2013.
 January 20 – Three Bureau of Corrections (BuCor) officials Ramoncito Roque, Maribel Bancil, and Veronica Buño were ordered dismissed from service by the Ombudsman in connection with the questionable implementation of the Good Conduct Time Allowance (GCTA), a controversy that broke out in August 2019.
 January 21 – The Sandiganbayan acquitted former Philippine National Police (PNP) chief Alan Purisima and ex-PNP Special Action Force chief Getulio Napeñas of graft and usurpation charges for their involvement in the antiterrorist operation that led to the deaths of 44 SAF commandos in Mamasapano, Maguindanao on January 25, 2015.
 January 22 – President Rodrigo Duterte signs Republic Act No. 11467, which hikes the excise taxes on alcohol and imposes new duties on heated tobacco and vapor products effective January 1, 2020.
 January 30:
 The Nueva Ecija Regional Trial Court (RTC) Branch 88 found Ma. Cristina Sergio and Julius Lacanilao, the recruiters of overseas Filipino worker Mary Jane Veloso guilty of illegal recruitment in a separate case filled by Lorna Valino, Ana Marie Gonzales, and Jenalyn Paraiso.
 First case of coronavirus disease 2019 is confirmed by the DOH.
 January 31 – The Sandiganbayan found former MRT General Manager Al Vitangcol III and PH Trams incorporator Arturo Soriano, guilty of graft and violation of Procurement Law, for awarding MRT3's maintenance contract to an unqualified joint venture, PH Trams and CB&T, in 2012.

February

 February 3 – A state of calamity is declared by the provincial government of Davao Occidental, due to the African Swine Fever outbreak, a first for the Davao Region.
 February 5 – The Senate Blue Ribbon Committee, has recommended the filing of criminal charges against individuals involved in the Good Conduct Time Allowance controversy, including the near-release of former Calauan, Laguna, mayor Antonio Sanchez, the mastermind in the June 1993 rape and murder of UPLB students Eileen Sarmenta and Allan Gomez. On February 12, the Senate adopts the said recommendation.
 February 8 – A group of archaeologists led by the National Quincentennial Committee, unearthed the grave of Filipino World War II guerilla and scientist Maria Orosa at the Malate Catholic School compound in Manila, nearly 75 years since her death on February 13, 1945.
 February 10 – The DOJ cleared Vice President Leni Robredo and several opposition figures of sedition but indicted former Senator Antonio Trillanes IV and 10 others for "conspiracy to commit sedition" over an alleged ouster plot against President Rodrigo Duterte. On February 14, a Quezon City court issued an arrest warrant against Trillanes and nine others and four days later, Trillanes posted a bail for the case.
 February 11 – The Philippines announced that it will terminate the Visiting Forces Agreement with the U.S. The announcement is rescinded on June 1.
 February 15 – President Rodrigo Duterte leads the inauguration of the commercial operations at Sangley Airport in Cavite, 8 months after he ordered the start of its general aviation operations.
 February 17:
 President Rodrigo Duterte signs Executive Order No. 104, or the Improving Access to Healthcare Through the Regulation of Prices in the Retail of Drugs and Medicines, that imposing a limit on the prices of several medicines and drugs.
 Senator Risa Hontiveros revealed the alleged "pastillas" modus operandi within the BI that allows the entry of Chinese nationals to the country in exchange for ₱10,000 each. On February 20, President Rodrigo Duterte relieved all Immigration officials and employees involved in the said bribery scheme that allegedly gives VIP treatment to Chinese visitors. On September 2, the NBI filed a complaint against 19 BI personnel in connection with the said scheme. On September 22, Joshua Paul Capiral, a NBI official was arrested in an entrapment operation for allegedly accepting bribes from Bureau of Immigration personnel involved in the said scheme. On September 28, DOJ filed extortion and graft charges against NBI legal assistance chief Joshua Paul Capiral and his brother Christopher John, an immigration officer, before the Manila Regional Trial Court for allegedly accepting bribes from Bureau of Immigration personnel involved in the said scheme.
 February 18 – Former Communist Party of the Philippines (CPP) chairman and New People's Army (NPA) commander Rodolfo Salas was arrested in Angeles City.
 February 19 – Former official of BuCor Fredric Anthony Santos was shot dead in Muntinlupa.
 February 21:
 The NBI filed a complaint for murder against Philippine Charity Sweepstakes Office board member Sandra Cam and six others over the killing of Charlie Yuson III on October 9, 2019.
 The BIR shut down the operations of SAFYI, the first Philippine Offshore Gaming Operator (POGO) to be given a license by the government, after it failed to pay the 5% franchise tax.
 Pres. Duterte signs Executive Order No. 106, that prohibits vaping in public and prohibited the sale and manufacture of unregistered e-cigarettes due to their potential health risks.
 February 24 – The Senate public services committee begins its hearing on the issues surrounding the franchise renewal of ABS-CBN Broadcasting Corporation. On February 26, President Rodrigo Duterte has accepted the apology of ABS-CBN over his unaired campaign ads during the 2016 presidential election.
 February 27 – The Philippine government has lifted the suspension on negotiations and signing of loan and grant agreements with countries that sponsored and voted in favor of a United Nations investigation on the country's human rights situation.
 February 28 – The Sandiganbayan has acquitted former PNP chief Alan Purisima of eight counts of perjury over his alleged failure to declare his wealth in full for 6 years.

March

 March 2 – The Bureau of Customs (BOC) confirms that suspected syndicates brought in an estimated $370 million into the Philippines in December 2019, with the help of Armed Forces of the Philippines (AFP), Philippine National Police (PNP) and airport police escorts.
 March 3 – Ombudsman Samuel Martires has filed graft and indirect bribery charges against former Nayong Pilipino Foundation, Inc. (NPFI) chairman of the board Patricia Ocampo-Desiongco and five other ex-NPFI officials for accepting free transportation to and accommodation in Jeju Island, South Korea from a private firm during negotiations on a lease contract involving the same firm.
 March 9 – President Duterte signs Proclamation No. 922, that declaring a public health emergency over the increasing number of coronavirus disease 2019 (COVID-19) cases in the country.
 March 12 – Code Red Sublevel 2 was declared in response to the COVID-19 pandemic and issuing a partial lockdown on Metro Manila to prevent a nationwide spread of the said disease.
 March 16:
 The Department of Agriculture (DA) has confirmed reports that bird flu or the H5N6 avian flu has been detected in Jaen, Nueva Ecija.
 President Duterte signs Proclamation No. 929, placing the entire Philippines under a state of calamity amid the ongoing situation of COVID-19. On September 16, President Duterte signs Proclamation No. 1021, that extends until September 12, 2021, the state of calamity in the country due to the COVID-19 pandemic.
 The National Telecommunications Commission (NTC) has issued Memorandum Order March 1, 2020, that all broadcast and communications companies would have the authority to stay on air with their permits automatically renewed while the entire Luzon is placed under enhanced community quarantine due to the COVID-19 pandemic.
 March 17 – Luzon is under enhanced community quarantine due to COVID-19 pandemic in the country as announced by the President in his evening address last March 16, 2020. This expanded the community quarantine imposed in Metro Manila on March 15. Quarantine measures in other parts of the country of varying levels were imposed as well in the following months.
 March 25 – President Rodrigo Duterte signs the Bayanihan to Heal as One Act of 2020 (Republic Act No. 11469), a measure that gives him additional powers to strengthen government's response to the coronavirus disease 2019 (COVID-19) pandemic after Congress urgently deliberated and passed the measure within a day. On July 1, the Supreme Court (SC) dismissed the petition filed by Jaime Ibañez questioning the constitutionality of the Bayanihan to Heal as One Act.

April

 April 6 – Diwata-1, the Philippines' first micro-satellite for scientific earth observation built by Filipino scientists, has been officially decommissioned after re-entering the Earth's atmosphere.
 April 14 – The government has begun its mass testing processes on the persons suspected of having COVID-19.
 April 17 – The Supreme Court has conducted a special en banc session, the first-ever done online in its 119-year history as the judiciary seeks to deal with urgent matters amid a Luzon-wide lockdown imposed to stop the spread of the coronavirus disease 2019 (COVID-19).
 April 24 – The Chinese Embassy in the Philippines received criticism after releasing a music video about the relations of China and the Philippines during the COVID-19 pandemic.
 April 27:
 15 senators, files a resolution that seeks to amend the Senate rules to allow the conduct of plenary sessions and committee hearings via teleconference amid the coronavirus disease 2019 (COVID-19) situation.
 President Duterte signs Executive Order No. 111, which abolished the Presidential Communications Development and Strategic Planning Office (PCDSPO), which served as his chief message-crafting body.
 April 28 – Taiwan has rejected the Philippine Department of Labor and Employment's (DOLE) moves to deport Elanel Egot Ordidor, an overseas Filipino worker over social media posts critical of President Rodrigo Duterte, saying the Philippines must first consult with Taiwan before taking any drastic action.

May

 May 1 – Pope Francis names former Manila Archbishop Cardinal Luis Antonio Tagle to the rank of Cardinal-Bishop, the highest title of a Cardinal in the Catholic Church.
 May 4:
 The radio and television franchise for ABS-CBN has expired. Renewal of the franchise is uncertain due to tense relations of the network with the current administration of President Rodrigo Duterte. On May 5, ABS-CBN's broadcasting operations were signed off the air at 7:52 p.m. due to the cease and desist order of the NTC to stop broadcast operations of the said network because of the expiration of its franchise granted to them on March 30, 1995. On June 23, the Supreme Court en banc has dismissed Solicitor General Jose Calida's petition questioning ABS-CBN Corporation's franchise, ruling that the issue was "moot and academic". On August 25, the Supreme Court has dismissed ABS-CBN's petition challenging the National Telecommunications Commission's cease and desist order that forced it to shut down broadcast operations on May 5. On September 10, NTC recalled the frequencies assigned to ABS-CBN, which it said was warranted in the absence of a legislative franchise.
 President Rodrigo Duterte has directed the Philippine Health Insurance Corporation (PhilHealth) to make the payment of premiums voluntary for overseas Filipino workers in light of opposition against premium rate increases.
 May 6 – President Duterte signs Executive Order No. 114, that ordered the implementation of the "Balik Probinsya, Bagong Pag-asa" Program to decongest Metro Manila and promote countryside development.
 May 8 – The Supreme Court (SC) has dismissed the petition filed by attorney Dino de Leon, that seeking the disclosure of President Rodrigo Duterte's health records. On September 8, SC denies with finality de Leon's bid to compel President Duterte to disclose his health records.
 May 11 – A plebiscite is set for the ratification of the law which approved the division of the provinces of Palawan into three provinces but rescheduled on March 13, 2021.
 May 13 – The National Bureau of Investigation has launched a probe into Overseas Workers Welfare Administration (OWWA) deputy administrator Mocha Uson over a coronavirus-related fake news.
 May 14 – Typhoon Vongfong (Ambo) makes landfall over Eastern Samar and hits Visayas, resulting to over a billion peso in damages.
 May 23 – BRP Jose Rizal, the country's first missile-capable warship has arrived in Subic, Zambales, after a 5-day maiden journey from South Korea.

June

 June 3 – The Senate Electoral Tribunal has denied the petition filed by Reymar Mansilungan and Efren Adan that seeking to declare Senator Aquilino "Koko" Pimentel III ineligible for the senatorial term 2019–2025.
 June 4 – The United Nations Office of the High Commissioner for Human Rights (UN-OHCHR) has released its comprehensive report on the widespread killings in the Philippines under President Rodrigo Duterte.
 June 5 – Former Presidential Commission on Good Government (PCGG) chairman Camilo Sabio was arrested by the members of National Bureau of Investigation in his home in Quezon City over the execution of judgment in one of the criminal cases against him pending before the Sandiganbayan.
 June 15 – The Manila Regional Trial Court Branch 46 convicts Rappler CEO Maria Ressa and former researcher-writer Reynaldo Santos Jr., of cyber libel over a 2012 article that linked a businessman to alleged illegal activities. On July 25, the Manila Regional Trial Court Branch 46 has denied the motion for reconsideration filed by Ressa and Santos, Jr. in the cyber libel case that they were convicted.
 June 19 – President Rodrigo Duterte signs Republic Act No. 11475, that officially transferring the capital and seat of government of Rizal province to Antipolo from Pasig.
 June 21 – An annular solar eclipse was witnessed by many astronomers and skywatchers throughout the country.
 June 25 – President Rodrigo Duterte signs Republic Act No. 11476, that mandating the inclusion of Good Manners and Right Conduct (GMRC) classes in the K-12 program.
 June 29 – Four soldiers were killed following a shooting incident with policemen in Barangay Walled City, Jolo, Sulu. On July 21, the National Bureau of Investigation (NBI) has filed criminal complaints against members of the local police in Sulu allegedly involved in the said shooting incident in Jolo. On September 7, the PNP-Internal Affairs Service has filed administrative and criminal complaints against cops involved in the said shooting incident.

July

 July 3 – President Rodrigo Duterte signs the Anti-Terrorism Act of 2020 (Republic Act No. 11479), a measure that giving the government more powers to act against persons or groups falling under what critics say is a dangerous and vague definition of terrorism.
 July 8 – Pope Francis names former Manila Archbishop Cardinal Luis Antonio Tagle as a member of the Pontifical Council for Inter-religious Dialogue, the Catholic Church's central office on the promotion of understanding among religions.
 July 10 – After 12 hearings which started last May 26, the House of Representatives, particularly on the Committee on Legislative Franchises, voted 70–11 to deny the franchise application of ABS-CBN.
 July 17 – President Rodrigo Duterte signs Republic Act No. 11480, which allows the president to move or reschedule the start of the school year in an event of a state of emergency or state of calamity.
 July 21 – Joel Apolinario, the founder of the Kapa Community Ministry International and 23 others were arrested in Surigao del Sur.
 July 23 – Four soldiers died and another was injured after a Philippine Air Force (PAF) helicopter crashed while taking off at the Cauayan Air Station in Isabela.
 July 27 – Dr. Roland Cortez, the chief of the National Center for Mental Health (NCMH), who was criticized over its handling of COVID-19 cases in the said facility in April 2020, was shot dead in Quezon City. On August 25, the Quezon City Police District (QCPD) has filed murder complaints against seven suspects who were allegedly involved in the killing of Dr. Cortez.
 July 29 – The Department of Agriculture through the Bureau of Animal Industry (DA-BAI) has confirmed the detection of the avian influenza A(H5N6) virus in an egg-producing farm in San Luis, Pampanga.
 July 30:
 After 9 years of hiding, former Dinagat Islands congressman Ruben Ecleo Jr., who was accused in the case of murder of Alona Bacolod-Ecleo in 2002 and anomalous 3 construction projects which undertaken between 1991 and 1994, during his term as mayor of San Jose, Dinagat Islands, was arrested in San Fernando, Pampanga.
 Wesley Barayuga, the board secretary of the Philippine Charity Sweepstakes Office (PCSO), was shot dead in Mandaluyong.

August

 August 4 – The Senate Committee of the Whole begins its hearing on the alleged irregularities and fresh controversies hounding state-run Philippine Health Insurance Corporation (PhilHealth). On August 7, President Rodrigo Duterte has formed a task force to investigate alleged corruption at the said agency. On August 18, Ombudsman Samuel Martires has issued a six-month long preventive suspension against 13 PhilHealth officials. On August 24, PhilHealth senior vice president for the legal sector Rodolfo del Rosario Jr. has tendered his irrevocable resignation from his post. On August 26, PhilHealth president and CEO Ricardo Morales has resigned from his post amid allegations of corruption plaguing the state insurer and his battle with lymphoma. On August 31, President Rodrigo Duterte has named former NBI chief Dante Gierran as the new head of PhilHealth. On September 14, President Rodrigo Duterte has approved the recommendations of a task force to file criminal and administrative charges against Morales and several other executives in connection with irregularities in the state insurer. On October 2, the inter-agency task force created to investigate alleged anomalies in the said agency has filed criminal complaint before the Office of the Ombudsman against Morales and several other agency officials over fund disbursements through the controversial Interim Reimbursement Mechanism (IRM), a system where advance releases are made to hospitals in case of unforeseen events. On October 8, PhilHealth has announced that a total of 43 senior officers have either tendered their courtesy resignation or retired from service.
 August 6 – The government has formally launched the One Hospital Command system which aims to improve the referral system and interoperability of public and private health care facilities catering to COVID-19 patients in the country.
 August 10 – Randall "Ka Randy" Echanis, the peasant activist and National Democratic Front of the Philippines (NDFP) peace consultant, was killed in Quezon City.
 August 13 – Abu Sayyaf Group (ASG) leader Anduljihad "Idang" Susukan, was arrested in Davao City.
 August 18 – A 6.6–magnitude earthquake hit the island of Masbate, leaving one person killed and injured 43 others.
 August 24 – At least 15 people were killed while 75 others were injured in twin bombings that ripped through Jolo, Sulu.
 August 25 – The Senate Blue Ribbon Committee, chaired by Senator Richard J. Gordon, announced and recommended the filing of criminal charges against former health secretary Janette Garin, former budget Secretary Florencio Abad and former Philippine Health Insurance Corporation (PhilHealth) president & CEO Alexander Padilla for allegedly diverting ₱10.6 billion of funds to construct barangay health centers and procure dental trucks which supposedly had not been utilized at all in December 2015.
 August 26 – Former Davao del Norte Representative Antonio "Tonyboy" Floirendo Jr., has been convicted of graft over the deal between his family-owned Tagum Agricultural Development Co., Inc. and the Bureau of Corrections in 2003.
 August 28 - ABS-CBN Corporation decided closed already "ABS-CBN Regional" of North Luzon Laoag, Baguio, Dagupan, and Pampanga; South Luzon Batangas and Naga City; Metro Cebu of Central Visayas (One of the Originating Station in Visayas); Iloilo, Bacolod and Puerto Princesa of Whole Western Visayas and Tacloban of Eastern Visayas; Metro Davao of Southern Mindanao (One of the Originating Station in Mindanao); General Santos and Cotabato of South Central Mindanao, Cagayan de Oro of North Mindanao, and Western Mindanao Zamboanga as Final Broadcast of "Provincial Morning shows" and 12 "TV Patrol Regional".

 August 31 – Employees of ABS-CBN Corporation were retrenched and its businesses were ceased.

September

 September 1:
 The Senate Committee of the Whole, announced and recommended the filing of criminal charges against former PhilHealth chief Ricardo Morales, Health Secretary Francisco Duque III and several other officials over the alleged irregularities in the state health insurer.
 The Supreme Court (SC) has dismissed a petition of Citizens Urgent Response to End COVID-19 (CURE COVID-19), that asking the tribunal to compel the government to conduct proactive mass testing for COVID-19, efficient contact tracing and isolation, and effective treatment of positive cases.
 The Office of the Ombudsman has issued Memorandum Circular No. 1, that limited the public access to Statements of Assets, Liabilities and Net Worth (SALN) of government officials, allowing release only for official investigations, by court order, or upon authority from officials themselves.
 September 3 – The Department of Environment and Natural Resources (DENR) begins its dumping of powdery-white sand on the baywalk of Manila Bay as part of the rehabilitation program of the said bay. The ₱389-million beautification project received criticism from the environmental groups. On September 8, Cebu Governor Gwendolyn Garcia has issued a cease and desist order on two companies involved in the extraction and sale of the dolomite used in the said beautification project.
 September 7 – President Rodrigo Duterte has granted an absolute pardon to US Marine Lance Corporal Joseph Scott Pemberton who was convicted of killing of transgender Filipino woman Jennifer Laude in 2014. On September 13, the Bureau of Immigration has deported Pemberton from the Philippines.
 September 8 – The Department of Agriculture (DA) has formally named Davao City, hometown of President Rodrigo Duterte, as the Cacao Capital of the Philippines.
 September 9 – The Supreme Court (SC) has unanimously denied the petition of attorney Larry Gadon that seeks to nullify the law that renamed Manila International Airport as Ninoy Aquino International Airport.
 September 11 – President Rodrigo Duterte has signed the Bayanihan to Recover as One Act (Republic Act No. 11494), which provides a COVID-19 relief package worth ₱165.5 billion.
 September 15:
 The Supreme Court has rejected a request of Larry Gadon's and that of the Office of the Solicitor General to secure the statements of assets, liabilities and net worth (SALN) of SC Associate Justice Marvic Leonen for a possible quo warranto petition.
 The Supreme Court has junked the plea for protective writs filed by Francis and Relissa Lucena, the parents of Alicia Jasper Lucena, the alleged missing activist after it was found out that she was not missing after all.
 September 16:
 Former Supreme Court Senior Associate Justice Antonio Carpio has joined Former Foreign Affairs Secretary Albert del Rosario and Ombudsman Conchita Carpio-Morales in a landmark case seeking to punish Chinese leader Xi Jinping over his country's destructive activities in the South China Sea.
 The European Parliament has adopted a resolution urging the Philippine government to drop charges against Rappler chief Maria Ressa and renew the franchise of ABS-CBN Broadcasting Corporation.
 Four personnel of the Philippine Air Force (PAF) were killed after a military helicopter was crashed in Lantawan, Basilan.
 September 22 – The Sandiganbayan has upheld its December 2019 decision ordering associates of the late dictator Ferdinand Marcos to return assets off their shares in Eastern Telecommunications Philippines, Inc. (ETPI) to the Philippine government for being ill-gotten.
 September 23 – Facebook has removed a network of fake accounts and pages allegedly linked to the Philippine military and police due to coordinated inauthentic behavior (CIB), a violation of its community standards.
 September 29:
 The Taguig Regional Trial Court Branch 266 has convicted seven men of multiple murder and multiple attempted murder over the deadly explosion at the Roxas Night Market in Davao City in 2016.
 September 30:
 Voted 184–1–9, members of the House of Representatives has rejected House Speaker Alan Peter Cayetano's offer of resignation in a swift move that came in the wake of reports that his term-sharing agreement with Marinduque Rep. Lord Allan Velasco was to take effect in October.
 The Supreme Court, sitting as the Presidential Electoral Tribunal, has required the Commission on Elections and the Office of the Solicitor General to comment on pending issues in the election protest filed by defeated candidate Bongbong Marcos against Vice President Leni Robredo.

October

 October 1 – The Sandiganbayan has cleared Terence King Ong, the head of slipper maker Kentex Manufacturing Corporation as well as Valenzuela City fire officials of criminal charges in connection with the May 13, 2015 factory fire that left at least 74 people dead and scores other injured.
 October 5 – The start of the 2020–21 school year in public schools has officially begun - a few months later than usual due to the COVID-19 pandemic.
 October 12–13 – 2020 Philippine House of Representatives leadership crisis: 186 majority members of the House of Representatives elect Lord Allan Jay Velasco as Speaker of the House of Representatives, unseating incumbent Alan Peter Cayetano amidst the political dispute over the Speakership outside the Session Hall of the Batasang Pambansa Complex. Cayetano declares Velasco's election as "illegal" and maintains that he is the Speaker. The crisis was later ended the next day when Rep. Cayetano announced his resignation from his post after lawmakers formally installed Velasco as their new leader at the Batasang Pambansa.
 October 12 – The Philippine Statistics Authority has begun its preregistration for the national identification (ID) system, with a target to register 10 million people.
 October 23 – Former acting chair of the Local Water Utilities Administration (LWUA) and Surigao del Sur Representative Prospero Pichay Jr. and two others were convicted of graft over the LWUA's illegal grant of ₱1.5 million in government funds to the National Chess Federation of the Philippines (NCFP) in 2010.
 October 25–26 – Typhoon Molave (Quinta) hits Bicol Region and Southern Luzon, resulting to damages of at least ₱4 billion.
 October 31 – Super Typhoon Goni (Rolly) makes landfall in Catanduanes. It was the strongest tropical cyclone observed worldwide in 2020 and broke 1-minute wind records. It results to more than ₱17 billion worth of damages.

November
 November 11 – Typhoon Vamco (Ulysses) makes landfalls on the island town of Patnanungan, Burdeos and on General Nakar in the Luzon landmass as a high-end Category 2-equivalent typhoon. It results to more than ₱20 billion worth of damages.
All seven gates of the dam were opened at 24 meters as the dam released over 5,037 cubic metres (1,331,000 US gal) of water into the Cagayan River as numerous riverside towns experienced massive flooding.

December
 December 15 – The International Criminal Court accuses the Philippines of crimes against humanity in its war on drugs.
 December 20 – Police officer Jonel Nuezca fatally shoots civilians Sonya Gregorio and her son, Frank, in Paniqui, Tarlac, causing renewed discussion over police brutality.
 December 25 – The Anti-Terrorism Council (ATC) has formally declared the Communist Party of the Philippines (CPP) and its armed wing New People’s Army (NPA) as terrorist groups.

Holidays

On November 15, 2019, the government announced at least 18 Philippine holidays for 2020 as declared by virtue of Proclamation No. 845, series of 2019. Note that in the list, holidays in italics are "special non-working holidays," those in bold are "regular holidays," and those in non-italics and non-bold are "special holidays for schools."

In addition, several other places observe local holidays, such as the foundation of their town. These are also "special days."
 January 1 – New Year's Day
 January 25 – Chinese New Year
 February 25 – 1986 EDSA Revolution
 April 9:
 Araw ng Kagitingan (Day of Valor)
 Maundy Thursday
 April 10 – Good Friday
 April 11 – Black Saturday
 May 1 – Labor Day
 May 25 – Eid'l Fitr (Feast of Ramadan)
 June 12 – Independence Day
 July 31 – Eid'l Adha (Feast of Sacrifice)
 August 21 – Ninoy Aquino Day
 August 31 – National Heroes Day
 November 1 – All Saints Day
 November 2 – Special non-working holiday
 November 30 – Bonifacio Day
 December 8 – Feast of the Immaculate Conception
 December 24 – Special non-working holiday
 December 25 – Christmas Day
 December 30 – Rizal Day
 December 31 – Last day of the year (in observance of New Year's celebrations)

Business and economy

 March 9 – The Philippine Stock Exchange (PSE) index lost 457.77 points or 6.76%, its steepest decline since the financial crisis of 2007–08.
 April 10 – The World Bank has approved a $500-million policy loan to boost the Philippines' capacity to respond and recover from disasters such as the ongoing coronavirus disease 2019 (COVID-19) crisis.
 April 23 – The World Bank approves a $100-million or ₱5.1 billion loan for the Philippines' COVID-19 Emergency Response Project. On April 28, the Philippines and the World Bank has signed the said loan agreement for the country's COVID-19 Emergency Response Project.
 April 28 – The Philippines and the Asian Development Bank (ADB) has signed an agreement for a $200-million loan for additional funding for the government's emergency cash assistance program to poor and vulnerable households hit by quarantine measures imposed to contain COVID-19 spread.
 May 2 – President Duterte signs Executive Order No. 113, that temporarily increased tariffs on imported crude oil and refined petroleum products to fund the country's COVID-19 response.
 May 7:
 The Philippine economy has contracted by 0.2% in the first quarter of 2020, for the first time since 1998, due to the COVID-19 pandemic and resulting lockdown.
 Fitch Ratings has downgraded its outlook on the Philippines to factor in the impact of the global health crisis brought about by the coronavirus disease 2019 (COVID-19).
 May 15 – The Energy Regulatory Commission (ERC) has ordered the Manila Electric Corporation (Meralco) to explain how it came up with consumers' electricity bills during the three billing cycles covering the lockdown periods.
 May 16 – ABS-CBN Corporation has resumed its trading of shares after complying with the disclosure requirements of the Philippine Stock Exchange (PSE).
 May 21 – The Philippines is experiencing a shortage of onion and garlic as local farmers are unable to "produce much" of the crops amid the coronavirus disease 2019 (COVID-19) pandemic.
 May 28 – The Asian Infrastructure Investment Bank (AIIB) has approved a $750 million (37.9 billion) loan to the Philippines to help the country cope with the COVID-19 pandemic.
 May 29 – The World Bank has approved a new $500-million policy loan to boost the Philippines' capacity to mitigate the impact of the coronavirus disease (COVID-19) pandemic on poor and vulnerable households and to provide financial relief to small and medium enterprises. On June 3, the Philippines and the World Bank has signed the said policy loan agreement to ease the social and economic impact of COVID-19 on poor households and workers of micro, small, and medium enterprises (MSMEs).
 June 3 – The Land Bank of the Philippines has approved some ₱250 million in loans under its ₱3-billion credit support for private academic institutions to provide a "study now, pay later" scheme to students hit by the COVID-19 pandemic.
 June 5:
 The Philippines and the Asian Development Bank (ADB) has signed a $400-million loan agreement that supports the government's efforts to strengthen domestic capital markets as the country recovers from the economic fallout resulting from the COVID-19 pandemic.
 The number of jobless Filipinos hit record-high of 17.7%, in April as the economic impact of the coronavirus disease 2019 caused the displacement of millions of workers.
 July 1 – The Philippines has signed a $26.5-million Asian Development Bank (ADB) loan which would finance the reforms needed to improve local property valuation and tax collection.
 July 29 – The Bangko Sentral ng Pilipinas (BSP) has officially launched the enhanced new generation currency (NGC) banknotes, which the central bank said features the latest anti-counterfeiting technology.
 August 6 – The Philippine economy has plunged further in the second quarter to mark its worst performance on record based on the available data since 1981, bringing the country to a technical recession amid the COVID-19 pandemic.
 August 24 – The Philippines has signed a €24.5-million financing agreement with the European Union, its third so far this year, to finance initiatives in the Bangsamoro region and assist in the rehabilitation of Marawi City.
 August 25:
 The Asian Development Bank has approved another $125 million (₱6 billion) loan to boost the Philippines' capacity to prevent and control the spread of COVID-19.
 Shakey's Pizza Asia Ventures Inc. has announced that they are entered into a franchise agreement with Singapore's Koufu Group Ltd. to bring the R&B milk tea brand to the Philippines.
 The Philippine Competition Commission (PCC) has approved the acquisition of a controlling stake in Manila Water Inc. by Enrique Razon-led Trident Water Holdings Company Inc., the holding firm of Prime Metroline Holdings Inc. (PMHI).
 September 15 – Olivia Limpe-Aw and Melanie Perkins, the two Filipina businesswomens were included in the Forbes Asia's 2020 Power Businesswomen List, which features 25 outstanding female leaders in the Asia-Pacific region.
 September 16 – The Supreme Court (SC) has decided in favor of billionaire Enrique Razon's MORE Electric and Power Corp. (MORE) in a legal battle involving power distribution in Iloilo City.
 September 24 – Eugenio "Gabby" Lopez III has tendered his resignation for personal reasons as Chairman Emeritus and Director of ABS-CBN Corporation and other Lopez-owned companies.
 October 5 – The Department of Transportation (DOTr) has suspended the mandatory use of Beep cards at the EDSA Busway, with stakeholders scrambling to look for other service providers that can suit the demands.
 October 15 – The oil exploration activities in the South China Sea resumed after President Rodrigo Duterte approves the recommendation of the Department of Energy (DOE) to lift the suspension of petroleum activities in the disputed waters.

Health

 January 30 – The Philippines confirmed its first case of COVID-19.
 February 1 – The first COVID-19 death outside China was reported in the Philippines: a Chinese tourist who recently arrived in the country.
 February 21 – The DOJ has indicted former Health secretary Janette Garin and several other health officials over children's deaths allegedly linked to the dengue vaccine Dengvaxia.
 March 6 – The DOH has confirmed that two Filipinos tested positive for COVID-19 for the first time in the Philippines. On March 7, the DOH and WHO confirms that the Philippines' fifth confirmed COVID-19 patient is the first case of local transmission.
 March 10 – The FDA approves the use of test kits developed by scientists at the University of the Philippines to confirm cases of COVID-19 in the country. On April 3, the FDA approves the said test kits for COVID-19 developed by UP-National Institutes of Health and manufactured by Manila HealthTek, Inc. On May 20, Health Undersecretary Maria Rosario Vergeire has announced, that the University of the Philippines-National Institutes of Health (UP-NIH) had recalled its locally-made coronavirus test kits over "very minor" defects. On July 19, DOH announced that the COVID-19 test kit developed by the University of the Philippines has been approved for commercial use.
 March 11 – The first Filipino COVID-19 patient death, was reported in the Philippines. The victim was a 67-year-old female who was confined at the Manila Doctors Hospital.
 October 6 – Health Secretary Francisco Duque III was elected as chairperson for the World Health Organization's Regional Committee for the Western Pacific.

Sports

 February 11–16, Badminton – Badminton Asia Team Championships
 March 12 – The major sports leagues across the country has announce a temporary suspension or termination of play in an attempt to slow the spread of the COVID-19 pandemic.
 March 19 – The NCAA officially terminated Season 95 due to COVID-19.
 April 7 – The UAAP Board has decided to cancel Season 82, following of the extension of the enhanced community quarantine amid COVID-19.
 April 29 – The Philippine Sports Commission (PSC) has announced the cancellation of all sporting events until December 2020, amid the threat of COVID-19.
 May 5 – The Department of Education (DepEd) has announced the suspension of the annual interschool sports tournament Palarong Pambansa and other events that draw large crowds as a precaution against the spread of COVID-19.
 May 8 – The 10th ASEAN Para Games which was rescheduled to October 3–9 of this year, has been officially cancelled due to COVID-19.
 June 1 – The Maharlika Pilipinas Basketball League (MPBL) has officially canceled its 2019–2020 season, citing the restrictions caused by the COVID-19 crisis as well as the uncertainty surrounding the franchise renewal of ABS-CBN.
 November 27 – Philippine Olympic Committee elections
 December 11 – The University Athletic Association of the Philippines announced the cancellation of its 83rd season due to the COVID-19 pandemic in the Philippines.

Entertainment and culture

 January 10–12 – The Philippines hosted the 24th Asian Television Awards, the first to be held in the country.
 February 6 – Binibining Pilipinas has released the official list of the 40 candidates for the 2020 pageant.
 February 9 – Miss Philippines Katrina Llegado wins the title of 5th runner-up in the Reina Hispanoamericana 2019 pageant which was held in Bolivia.
 February 14 – The Miss Universe Philippines (MUP) organization introduced the 46 official candidates for the 2020 pageant.
 February 18 – Dual-voiced Filipino singer Marcelito Pomoy was named as 3rd runner up for the well renowned US talent competition America's Got Talent: The Champions.
 February 22 – The coronation event of the Manhunt International 2020 pageant takes place at the New Frontier Theatre in Quezon City. For the second time that the Philippines hosted the event. Paul Luzineau of Netherlands was crowned as Manhunt International 2020.
 February 27 – Luzon, the largest island in the Philippines, was recognized the world's second Trending Destination by TripAdvisor in its 2020 Travellers' Choice Awards.
 March 5 – Former President Corazon Aquino and Rappler CEO Maria Ressa have been included in Time Magazine's 100 Most Influential Women of the century.
 March 8 – Cristine Reyes wins the best actress award at the 40th edition of the Porto International Film Festival for her performance in the movie Untrue.
 March 16 – The acclaimed film Write About Love, about screenwriters who fall in love in the process of collaborating, was recognized at the 2020 Osaka Asian Film Festival (OAFF).
 April 2 – Five Philippine representatives were included in Forbes 30 Under 30 Asia Class of 2020, joining a list of Asia's top young entrepreneurs and change-makers.
 April 8 – 26-year-old Ryan Gersava of Sultan Kudarat has topped the World Summit Awards (WSA) Global Champion under the Young Innovators category for 2020 with his virtual school for persons with disabilities and other disadvantaged sectors.
 April 22 – Three ABS-CBN News documentaries and two GMA Public Affairs documentaries won medals in the prestigious 2020 New York Festivals TV & Film Awards.
 April 28 – ABS-CBN stars Liza Soberano and Ivana Alawi are among the early nominees in the 2020 edition of 100 Most Beautiful Faces, an international list driven by social media.
 May 6 – Cebu-based artist Maria Victoria "Bambi" Beltran was selected as one of 17 laureates of the 2020 Deutsche Welle (DW) Freedom of Speech Award.
 May 29 – Binibining Pilipinas candidate Maureen Montagne has declined the Miss Eco International 2019 title after reigning queen Suheyn Cipriani of Peru got dethroned due to pregnancy and she is now competing in the Binibining Pilipinas 2020 beauty pageant.
 May 31 – The Philippines has landed on Forbes' list of Rising Stars in Travel, one of seven countries cited to have potential to become major tourist destinations.
 June 18 – The Roman Catholic Diocese of Maasin in Southern Leyte was acknowledged by the Vatican for being the first in the Catholic Church to switch to renewable energy.
 June 25 – Pope Francis appointed four priests of the Roman Catholic Archdiocese of Lingayen–Dagupan as the Catholic Church's new "Missionaries of Mercy."
 June 30:
 Lumad Joeffrey S. Mambucon became the first Tigwahanon-Manobo doctor of medicine.
 A fossil megalodon tooth was found in Maribojoc, Bohol.
 July 5 – Roxanne Allison Baeyens, was crowned as Miss Philippines Earth 2020, during the coronation event of the Miss Philippines Earth 2020, which was held for the first time through virtual contest.
 July 8 – The island province of Palawan has reclaimed the top spot in Travel + Leisure's "World's Best Islands" list for 2020 after getting the most votes from the magazine's readers.
 July 21 – Liza Diño, the head of the Film Development Council of the Philippines (FDCP), has been removed from the executive committee of the Metro Manila Film Festival (MMFF).
 July 26:
 Cinemalaya 2019 audience choice awardee for full-length feature "Belle Douleur" is nominated in the 2020 Santorini Film Festival.
 Tiffany Grace Uy, the University of the Philippines' highest grade record holder since World War II in June 2015, has graduated from the UP College of Medicine Class of 2020 with Latin honors anew.
 July 27 – "Here, Here", a short film directed by Joanne Cesario, was selected for the 2020 Locarno Film Festival's Pardi di domani international competition.
 July 28:
Miss World Philippines announced that it acquired the Miss Supranational beauty pageant and will be sending representatives to the Poland-based pageant.
 Filipina dancer Andree Camille "AC" Bonifacio has won 2nd place in Blackpink's "How You Like That" dance cover contest.
 August 16 – Heart Salvador, Cydel Gabutero, Isang Manlapaz and Kendra Aguirre, were declared as the winners of the second season of The Voice Teens.
 August 19 – The National Historical Commission of the Philippines (NHCP) has sustained its findings that the Limasawa Island in Southern Leyte as the site of the 1521 Easter Sunday Mass, the first Catholic mass in the country.
 October 10 – ZOE TV channel 11 was rebranded to A2Z, which feature some contents of programs from its selected blocktimers (ABS-CBN and Knowledge Channel), licensors and providers (CBN Asia, Trinity Broadcasting Network and others), and ZOE's owned Light TV on the said network, after ABS-CBN and ZOE agreed with the entering of blocktime deal on October 6. This also marks the return of ABS-CBN programmings on free TV after the cease-and-desist order by National Telecommunications Commission due to expired legislative franchise on May 5 and the denial of its renewed legislative franchise on July 10.
 October 25 – The first coronation event of the Miss Universe Philippines 2020 pageant was held at the Baguio Country Club and Cordillera Convention Hall in Baguio. Rabiya Mateo of Iloilo City was crowned as Miss Universe Philippines 2020.

Deaths

January
 January 3 – Ninez Cacho-Olivares (b. 1941), journalist (Daily Tribune)
 January 9 – Iñaki Vicente (b. 1955), football player
 January 25 – Ben Hur Villanueva (b. 1938), sculptor

February
 February 4 – Fernando Suarez (b. 1967), Roman Catholic priest
 February 5 – Delfin Castro (b. 1925), former major general of the Armed Forces of the Philippines

March
 March 21 – Aileen Baviera (b. 1959), former dean of the University of the Philippines Asian Center
 March 23 – Alan Ortiz (b. 1953), former head of the National Transmission Corporation and SMC Global Power Holdings and current president of the Philippine Council for Foreign Relations
 March 25 – Aric del Rosario (b. 1940), former basketball coach, UST Growling Tigers Men's Basketball
 March 26:
Ito Curata (b. 1959), fashion designer
 Menggie Cobarrubias (b. 1951), veteran actor
 March 29 - Roneto A. Carandang (b. 1941), Brgy. Chairman of Concepcion, (San Pablo City, Laguna) (1994-2007)
 March 30 – Arianne Caoili (b. 1986), chess player

April
 April 2 – Bernardita Catalla (b. 1958), Philippine Ambassador to Lebanon
 April 4 – Luis Eduardo Aute (b. 1944), artist
 April 5 – Jun Factoran (b. 1944), lawyer, politician, and former DENR secretary (1987–1992)
 April 7 – Domingo Villanueva (b. 1965), cyclist
 April 9 – Leila Benitez-McCollum (b. 1930), former TV and radio personality
 April 13 – Vicente Magsaysay (b. 1940), politician and former Governor of Zambales
 April 15 – Alfonso Marquez (b. 1938), former basketball player
 April 20 – Heherson Alvarez (b. 1939), politician, former Senator (1987–1998), Congressman (1998–2001), and Minister of Agrarian Reform (1986–1987)
 April 27 – Ramon Jimenez Jr. (b. 1955), advertising executive, politician, and former DOT secretary (2011–2016)
 April 30 – Bong Osorio (b. 1954), media executive and communication professor

May
 May 1 – Gilbert Luis Centina III (b. 1947), Roman Catholic priest, poet and author
 May 7 – Peque Gallaga (b. 1943), film director, screenwriter and actor
 May 10 – Sonny Parsons (b. 1958), actor, singer, and member of the Filipino band, Hagibis
 May 14 – Teresa Aquino-Oreta (b. 1944), former member of the Philippine House of Representatives from Lone District of Malabon-Navotas (1987–1998) and senator (1998–2004)

June
 June 8 – Oliver Ongtawco (b. 1941), bowler
 June 10 – Anita Linda (b. 1924), veteran film actress and once called the "Oldest Living Actress"
 June 12 – Perfecto R. Yasay, Jr. (b. 1947), former secretary of DFA (2016–2017)
 June 13 – Nic Jorge (b. 1941), basketball coach
 June 15 – Lilia Dizon (b. 1928), veteran film actress
 June 16 – Danding Cojuangco (b. 1935), businessman and politician
 June 22 – Jesus Dosado (b. 1940), Roman Catholic prelate and archbishop of Ozamiz
 June 26 – Ramon Revilla Sr. (b. 1927), former senator and actor
 June 27 – Antonio Cuenco (b. 1936), former congressman (2nd District of Cebu City)

July
 July 5  Marissa Mercado-Andaya (b. 1969), filipina politician
 July 14 – Susan Quimpo (b. 1961), activist and author
 July 15 – Mateo A.T. Caparas (b. 1923), lawyer and politician
 July 18:
 Jaybee Sebastian (b. 1980), high-profile inmate interred at the New Bilibid Prison (NBP)
 Manuel C. Sobreviñas (b. 1924), Roman Catholic prelate and Bishop of Roman Catholic Diocese of Imus
 July 22 – Chito Soganub (b. 1972), priest and Marawi siege hostage and survivor
 July 23:
Tomas Joson III (b. 1948), politician and former governor of Nueva Ecija
Fidel Agcaoili (b. 1944), activist, revolutionary, and peace negotiator

August
 August 1 – Resurreccion Borra (b. 1935), former COMELEC chairman (2007–2008)
 August 4 – Eddie Ilarde (b. 1934), veteran radio and television host and former legislator
 August 8 – Alfredo Lim (b. 1929), former senator (2004–2007) and mayor of Manila (1992–1998, 2007–2013)
 August 10 – Neil Ocampo (b. 1958), anchorman
 August 11 – Sixto Brillantes (b. 1939), former COMELEC chairman (2011–2015)
 August 16 – Emman Nimedez (b. 1999), vlogger and online sensation
 August 17 – Zara Alvarez (b. 1981), Human rights activist
 August 26 – Oscar Cruz (b. 1934), former archbishop emeritus of Lingayen–Dagupan
 August 27 – Gilda Cordero-Fernando (b. 1930), writer, visual artist, fashion designer, and publisher

September
 September 4:
 Lloyd Cadena (b. 1993), vlogger, radio personality, and author
 Ricardo "Ardot" Parojinog, former Ozamiz City councilor
 September 5 – Orlando Bauzon (b. 1944), former basketball player and coach
 September 8 – Bernardita Ramos (b. 1944), representative of the 2nd District of Sorsogon
 September 9 – Arnulfo Fuentebella (b. 1945), former Speaker of the Philippine House of Representatives and former representative of the 3rd (now 4th) District of Camarines Sur
 September 14 – Cynthia Barker (b. 1962), first Filipina mayor in England

October
 October 12 – Ameurfina Melencio-Herrera (b. 1922), Filipino judge and Associate Justice of the Supreme Court (1979–1992)
 October 17 – Yusop Jikiri (b. 1951), chairperson of the Moro National Liberation Front (MNLF)
 October 18 – Jose Melo (b. 1932), Associate Justice of the Supreme Court (1992–2002) and former COMELEC chairman (2008–2011)
 October 30 – Madam Auring (b. 1940), fortune teller and actress

November
 November 10 – Mila del Sol (b. 1923), prewar actress, entrepreneur, and philanthropist
 November 16 – Raul del Mar (b. 1941), representative of the 1st District of Cebu City
 November 20 – Rudy del Rosario (b. 1969), football player and coach of Kaya F.C.
 November 21 – Vangie de Jesus (b. 1951 or 1952), former coach of Philippines women's national volleyball team
 November 26 – Jamir Garcia (b. 1978), Slapshock frontman
 November 29 – April Boy Regino (b. 1961), singer and recording artist

December
 December 21 – Mark Joseph (b. 1957), former actor
 December 24 – Benhur Salimbangon, (b. 1945), former representative of the 4th District of Cebu
 December 29 – Amelia Lapeña Bonifacio (b. 1930), National Artist for Theater

See also

Country overviews
 Philippines
 History of Philippines
 History of modern Philippines
 Outline of Philippines
 Government of Philippines
 Politics of Philippines
 Years in the Philippines
 Timeline of Philippine history

Related timelines for current period
 Timeline of the COVID-19 pandemic in the Philippines
 2020
 2020 in politics and government
 2020s

References 

 
2020 in Southeast Asia
Philippines
2020s in the Philippines
Years of the 21st century in the Philippines